Maria Abramović (born 19 August 1987) is a retired Croatian tennis player.

Abramović took part in the 2006 Bangalore Open but lost in the second round to Tatiana Poutchek. In her career, she won seven ITF titles. Her sister Ivana Abramović also played professional tennis on ITF Circuit and WTA Tour.

ITF Circuit finals

Singles: 3 (3 runner-ups)

Doubles: 20 (7 titles, 13 runner-ups)

References

External links
 
 

1987 births
Living people
Tennis players from Zagreb
Croatian female tennis players
Universiade medalists in tennis
Universiade bronze medalists for Croatia
Medalists at the 2007 Summer Universiade
21st-century Croatian women